, who often published as J. Takakusu, was a Japanese academic, an advocate for expanding higher education opportunities, and an internationally known Buddhist scholar.  He was an active Esperantist.

Early life
Takakusu was born in Hiroshima Prefecture, adopted by the Takakusu family of Kobe, and sent to England to study Sanskrit at Oxford University (1890). After receiving his doctorate, he continued his studies in France and Germany.

Academic career
Upon his return to Japan in 1894, he was appointed Professor at the Tokyo Imperial University and Director of Tokyo School of Foreign Languages.

He founded the Musashino Girls' School in 1924. The institution evolved on the principle of "Buddhist-based human education," moving in 1929 to its present location in Nishitōkyō, Tokyo and becoming Musashino Women's University.

This massive compendium is now available online as the SAT Taishō Database,(https://21dzk.l.u-tokyo.ac.jp/SAT/) and the CBETA (https://www.cbeta.org) Tripitaka.

In 1930, he was named President of the Tokyo Imperial University. He was a member of the Imperial Academy of Japan and a Fellow of the British Academy.  He was a recipient of Asahi Cultural Prize and the Japanese government's Order of Culture.  He was awarded an honorary degree by Tokyo Imperial University; and he was similarly honored by the universities at Oxford, Leipzig, and Heidelberg.

At the time of his death in June 1945, he was Professor Emeritus of Sanskrit at the Tokyo Imperial University.

Devotion to Esperanto
In 1906, he was one of the founder member of the Japanese Esperantists Association (JEA), and its head in the Tokyo section.

Honors
 Asahi Cultural Prize
 Order of Culture, 1944.

Selected works 
 The Amitâyur dhyâna-sûtra, trans J. Takakusu, in Buddhist Mahâyâna Texts, Part 2, published in Sacred Books of the East, vol. 49, pp. 161–201, Oxford University Press, 1894.
 A Record of the Buddhist Religion as Practised in India and the Malay Archipelago, London: Clarendon Press, 1896.
 Dai Nihon Bukkyō zensho, ed. Takakusu Junjirō et al., 150 volumes, Tokyo: Dai Nihon Bukkyō zensho kankōkai, 1913-1921. (Re-edited, 100 volumes, Suzuki gakujutsu zaidan, Tokyo: Kōdansha, 1970-1973.)
 Taishō shinshū Daizōkyō 大正新脩大蔵経, Takakusu Junjirō, Watanabe Kaigyoku. 100 volumes, Tokyo: Taisho Issaikyo Kankokai, 1924-1934.
 Nanden daizōkyō 南伝大蔵経 (The Mahātripiṭaka of the Southern Tradition) [Japanese translation of the Pāli Canon], ed. Takakusu Junjirō. 65 volumes, Tokyo: Daizokyo shuppansha, 1935-1941.
 The Essentials of Buddhist Philosophy, ed. Wing-tsit Chan and Charles Moors. Greenwood Press, Westport, CT. 1976

Bibliography
 Klautau, Orion (2014). Nationalizing the Dharma: Takakusu Junjirō and the Politics of Buddhist Scholarship in Early Twentieth-Century Japan, Japanese Religions 29 (1-2), 53-70

See also

Japanese students in Britain

References

1866 births
1945 deaths
Japanese scholars of Buddhism
Japanese indologists
Japanese expatriates in the United Kingdom
Japanese Esperantists
Recipients of the Order of Culture
Musashino University
University and college founders